"Cohen on the Telephone", also known as "Cohen at the Telephone" is a comedy monologue. The monologue was released on cylinder records, 78 rpm records, and early sound film.

History of recordings
Joe Hayman first recorded the monologue in London in July 1913 for Regal Records and was issued in the U.S. by Columbia Records. Hayman's version of the song reached over 2 million sales in the United States. The success of the record led to cover versions recorded by performers such as Monroe Silver in 1914, and Barney Bernard whose version was recorded in March 1916 for Victor Records In 1927, Victor issued an electrical recording of that monologue by Julius Tannen. and George Thompson whose version on Edison Records was released in 1916.

A sound-on-film recording was made in 1923 with Monroe Silver by Lee de Forest in the Phonofilm process, and with George Sidney (1876–1945) in September 1929 by Universal Pictures.

Hayman recorded a similar routine entitled "Cohen Buys a Wireless Set" in 1923 on Columbia Records.

Synopsis of sketch
The monologue is Mr. Cohen's attempt to contact his landlord using a telephone of the period.  The humor is derived from that of the Cohen's "stereotypical" tendency to make puns, and perhaps the difficulty in being understood on the then primitive telephone with his thick Yiddish accent:

"Hello, I'm Cohen...I'M COHEN...No- I ain't Goin...I'm stopping here....Hello! This is your tenant Cohen...YOUR TENANT COHEN....No, NOT Lieutenant Cohen..."

The purpose of the call was to ask the landlord to send a repairman down to his location after a windstorm had caused property damage. In frustration, he hangs up at the end of the record and decides to arrange for the repairs himself.

References

Bibliography
Smith, Jacob (2008) Vocal Tracks: Performance and Sound Media University of California Press, pages 205–207

External links
Cohen at the Telephone (1923) at IMDB
Cohen at the Telephone (1929) at IMDB
Cohen on the Telephone (1923) at SilentEra with picture of Monroe Silver in the film

Comedy albums by British artists
1913 works
Ethnic humour
Jewish comedy and humor